Atossa (Old Persian: Utauθa, or Old Iranian: Hutauθa; 550–475 BC) was an Achaemenid empress. She was the daughter of Cyrus the Great, and the wife of Darius the Great.

Name 
The name "Atossa" (or "Atusa") means "bestowing very richly" or "well trickling" or "well granting". Atossa is the Greek transliteration of the Old Persian name Utauθa. Her name in Avestan is Hutaosā.

Life 
She was eldest daughter of Cyrus the Great; her mother may have been Cassandane. According to Greek sources she married her brother Cambyses II after her father's death, yet it remains problematic to determine the reliability of these accounts. According to Herodotus, Cambyses supposedly married two of his sisters, Atossa and Roxane. This would have been regarded as illegal. However, Herodotus also states that Cambyses married Otanes' daughter Phaidyme, whilst his contemporary Ctesias names Roxane as Cambyses' wife, but she is not referred to as his sister.

The accusations against Cambyses of committing incest are mentioned as part of his "blasphemous actions", which were designed to illustrate his "madness and vanity". These reports all derive from the same Egyptian source that was antagonistic towards Cambyses, and some of these allegations of "crimes", such as the killing of the Apis bull, have been confirmed as false, which means that the report of Cambyses' supposed incestuous acts is questionable.

When Darius I defeated the followers of a man claiming to be Bardiya (Smerdis), the younger brother of Cambyses II in 522 BC, he married Atossa. Atossa played an important role in the Achaemenid royal family, as she bore Darius the Great the next Achaemenid king, Xerxes I.

Atossa had a "great authority" in the Achaemenid royal house and her marriage with Darius I is likely due to her power, influence and the fact that she was a direct descendant of Cyrus.

Herodotus records in The Histories that Atossa was troubled by a bleeding lump in her breast. A Greek slave, Democedes, excised the tumor. This is the first recorded case of mastitis, sometimes interpreted as a sign of an inflammatory breast cancer.

Xerxes I was the eldest son of Atossa and Darius. Atossa lived to see Xerxes invade Greece. Atossa's special position enabled Xerxes, who was not the eldest son of Darius, to succeed his father.

Literary references

Aeschylus included her as a central character in his tragedy The Persians. Atossa is also one of the major characters in the Gore Vidal novel Creation.

Atossa is included by Herodotus in his The Histories as a strong woman with considerable influence. Herodotus even goes so far as to suggest that her wanting Hellene servant-girls was a reason for her husband Darius the Great deciding to begin  a campaign against Greece
in 492 BC.

In his non-fictional history of cancer, The Emperor of All Maladies, Siddhartha Mukherjee imagines Atossa traveling through time, encountering different diagnoses and treatments for her breast cancer. Atossa becomes emblematic of cancer sufferers through history.

Dr. Jason Fung, in his book The Cancer Code, references Atossa's inflammatory breast cancer as written about by the contemporary Greek historian Herodotus.

Legacy 
Minor planet 810 Atossa discovered by Max Wolf, is named in her honor.

The poet Matthew Arnold named his Persian cat ‘Atossa’. She is celebrated in his poem of 1882 called ‘Poor Matthias’, about the death of a pet canary.

References

Sources 
 
 
 

6th-century BC women
5th-century BC women
Queens of the Achaemenid Empire
6th-century BC Iranian people
5th-century BC Iranian people
Remarried royal consorts
Family of Darius the Great
Cambyses II
Teispids